Helloween is the debut EP by German heavy metal band Helloween. It was released on 1 April 1985 on Noise Records.

Background
Although it is a speed metal rather than a power metal album, the record is significant as the first effort by the group that would redefine the power metal genre. Helloween was followed up later that same year by the band's first full-length album, Walls of Jericho.

Track listing

Notes
The "Happy Happy Halloween" intro piece from "Starlight" is taken from the 1982 film Halloween III: Season of the Witch
The surprise track on the picture disc re-release features vocalist Michael Kiske, which is his first recording with Helloween. The EP was released in December 1986 in conjunction to his introduction in the band. The "White Christmas" piece features Kiske, Michael Weikath and Kai Hansen on vocals, while the "I'll Be Your Santa Claus" piece features only Kiske on vocals
A 1997 unofficial cassette release by Moon Records titles the album as Judas with a different album cover, and features the songs "How Many Tears", "Perfect Gentleman" and "Steel Tormentor"
A 1998 unofficial CD release by Agat Company contains the 1996 single Power
A 2017 Malaysian CD release features the songs "Don't Run for Cover" and "Judas"

Personnel
Kai Hansen – vocals, guitar
Michael Weikath – guitar
Markus Grosskopf – bass
Ingo Schwichtenberg – drums

Production
 Recorded January – February 1985 at Musiclab Studio, Berlin, Germany
 Produced by Helloween
 Engineered and mixed by Harris Johns (who also contributes the devil laugh on "Victim of Fate")
 Cover design by Uwe Karczewski, Hamburg, Germany

References

Helloween albums
1985 EPs
Noise Records EPs
Albums produced by Harris Johns